Chalimbana University is located in Chongwe, Lusaka, Zambia.It was founded in 1939 as Jeanes Training Centre.

References

External links 
 

Universities in Zambia